Aghchay (also Romanized as Agh Chay)  is a village in Heyran Rural District, in the Central District of Astara County, Gilan Province, Iran.  The name of the village, ağ çay means "white stream" in Azeri Turkish.

References 

Populated places in Astara County